Bohdan Kondratyuk (born 19 June 1987) is a professional Ukrainian footballer defender, who played in the professional Ukrainian First League club FC Poltava, FC Stal Alchevsk, FC Borysfen Boryspil.

For some four seasons played for FC Metalurh Donetsk in reserve competitions of the UPL.

He is the product of the Kiev city football schools (YFC ATEK Kyiv).

After 2014 Kondratyuk has played in amateurs.

References
Profile on Football Squads
 Profile at Official FFU site (Ukr)

1987 births
Living people
Ukrainian footballers
FC Borysfen Boryspil players
FC Metalurh Donetsk players
FC Stal Alchevsk players
FC Poltava players
FC LNZ Cherkasy players
Ukrainian Premier League players
Association football defenders